Jakub Žďánský (born 28 May 1986) is a Czech futsal player who plays for Era-Pack Chrudim and the Czech Republic national futsal team. He played in the 2012 FIFA Futsal World Cup.

References

External links 
 UEFA profile

1986 births
Living people
Futsal goalkeepers
Czech men's futsal players